Abinanti is a surname. Notable people with the surname include:

Abby Abinanti (born 1947), American lawyer
Thomas J. Abinanti (born 1946), American politician and lawyer

See also
 Abitanti